In the run up to the 2017 German federal election, various organisations carry out opinion polling to gauge voting intention in Germany. Results of such polls are displayed in this article.

The date range for these opinion polls are from the previous general election, held on 22 September 2013, to the present day. The next general election is scheduled to be held on 24 September 2017.

Graphical summary

The polls are from September 2013 (the last federal election) up to the current date. Each colored line represents a political party.

Poll results
Individual poll results are listed in the table below in reverse chronological order, showing the most recent first, and using the date the survey's fieldwork was done, as opposed to the date of publication. If such date is unknown, the date of publication is given instead. The highest percentage figure in each polling survey is displayed with its background shaded in the leading party's colour. In the instance of a tie, the figures with the highest percentages are shaded. The lead column on the right shows the percentage-point difference between the two parties with the highest figures.

2017

2016

2015

2014

2013

YouGov model 
For the 2017 German federal election, YouGov is publishing figures for a model similar to those created for the 2016 United States presidential election, 2016 United Kingdom European Union membership referendum, and 2017 United Kingdom general election using Multilevel Regression with Poststratification (MRP), which utilizes demographic data on individuals' characteristics to project results across different states and constituencies using approximately 1,200 online interviews each day with voters in the YouGov panel.

By state 
Brandenburg

Berlin

Baden-Württemberg

Bavaria

Bremen

Hesse

Hamburg

Mecklenburg-Vorpommern

Lower Saxony

North Rhine-Westphalia

Rhineland-Palatinate

Schleswig-Holstein

Saarland

Saxony

Saxony-Anhalt

Thuringia

Subnational polling

By state

West Germany

East Germany

See also
 Opinion polling for the 2021 German federal election
 Opinion polling for the German federal election, 2013

References

External links
 Opinion poll tracker with data
 Opinion poll tracker with data, graph, daily average & coalition calculator 
 Constituency projections and opinion poll tracker with data
 Opinion poll tracker with graph and weekly average
 German Polling Observatory (Bayesian poll aggregator, English)
 The Crosstab 

2017 elections in Germany
Opinion polling in Germany
Germany